Hoymille (from Flemish; Hooimille in modern Dutch spelling) is a commune in the Nord department in northern France.
It is situated adjacent to the east of Bergues. The village hosts an annual carnival at the end February.  The local church is St Gérard's.

Heraldry

See also
Communes of the Nord department

References

Communes of Nord (French department)
French Flanders